Jeffrey Michael Tisdel (born January 10, 1956) is a former American football coach. He served as the head football coach at the University of Nevada, Reno from 1996 to 1999, compiling a record of 23–22.  Tisdel has two stints as the head football coach at Sierra College, a junior college in Rocklin, California, from 2000 to 2005 and from 2007 to 2012. His accomplishments include coaching the Nevada Wolf Pack in its first NCAA Division I-A bowl game victory, in the 1996 Las Vegas Bowl, and leading Sierra to a nation-leading 37-game winning streak between 2002 and 2005. Tisdel was also the first quarterback for Nevada to play in Division I-AA, moving up from Division II in 1978 and the first quarterback to play for Chris Ault, who became a member of the College Football Hall of Fame in 2002. After taking the 2006 season off, Tisdel returned to coaching his Sierra College team which ended the 2007 season ranked fifth in the nation by JCGridiron.com.

Coaching career
Tisdel experienced his greatest successes at the junior college level, especially at Sierra College, where he brought a relative no-name program to national prominence at its level of competition by collecting three conference championships and, in his first year there, brought Sierra College to second place in the Bay Valley Conference. He also had success in his first head coaching position at Sacramento City College, where his teams won three Northern California Athletic League championships.

Tisdel's head coaching record at the college level was more mixed. In 1996, he was hired as the head football coach at the University of Nevada, Reno. His 1996 team compiled a 9–3 record, secured the Big West Conference title, and won the 1996 Las Vegas Bowl, Nevada's first victory in an NCAA Division I-A bowl game. Tisdel's subsequent Nevada teams were mediocre until, in the 1999 season, he coached Nevada to its worst record since 1975 at 3–8. Tisdel announced his resignation prior to the final game of the 1999 season. His successor, Chris Tormey, coached Nevada to an even more futile 2–10 record the next year, the program's worst record since Dick Trachok's 1–9 season in 1964, and was fired after the end of the 2003 season.

Head coaching record

College

Junior college

References

1956 births
Living people
American football quarterbacks
High school football coaches in California
Junior college football coaches in the United States
Nevada Wolf Pack football coaches
Nevada Wolf Pack football players
Players of American football from Sacramento, California
Saint Mary's Gaels football coaches